The 2000–01 Real Murcia season was the club's 82nd season in existence and the first season back in the second division of Spanish football since 1994. In addition to the domestic league, Real Murcia participated in this season's edition of the Copa del Rey. The season covered the period from 1 July 2000 to 30 June 2021.

Pre-season and friendlies

Competitions

Overview

Segunda División

League table

Results summary

Results by round

Matches

Copa del Rey

Statistics

Goalscorers

References

External links

Real Murcia